Map of places in North Ayrshire compiled from this list
See the list of places in Scotland for places in other counties.

This List of places in North Ayrshire is a list of links for any town, village, hamlet, castle, golf course, historic house, nature reserve, reservoir, river, and other place of interest in the North Ayrshire council area of Scotland.

A
Ardrossan, Ardrossan Railway
Arran, Arran Brewery

B
Beith
Benslie
Blackwaterfoot
Bourtreehill
Brodick, Brodick Castle

C
Cathedral of the Isles
Cladach
Clyde Muirshiel Regional Park
Cunninghamhead

D
Dalry
Dreghorn

E
Eglinton Country Park, Eglinton Tournament Bridge

F
Fairlie
Fergushill
Firth of Clyde

G
Garrier Burn
Girdle Toll
Glengarnock
Great Cumbrae

I
Irvine, Irvine railway station

K
Kilbirnie
Kilwinning

L
Laigh Milton viaduct
Lambroughton
Lamlash
Lanarkshire and Ayrshire Railway
Largs, Largs railway station
Little Cumbrae
Lochranza

M
Millport
Montfode Castle
Museum of the Cumbraes

P
Perceton
Portencross

S
Saltcoats, Saltcoats railway station
Seamill
Skelmorlie
Skelmorlie Aisle
Springside, Springside railway station
Stevenston

W
West Kilbride, West Kilbride railway station
Whiting Bay

See also
List of places in Scotland
List of islands of Scotland

North Ayrshire
Geography of North Ayrshire
Lists of places in Scotland
Populated places in Scotland